The Obrenovac-Surčin Bridge is the bridge crossing the river Sava in the suburban section of Belgrade, the capital of Serbia. With the partially steel and partially concrete construction today, the building of the bridge began in 1994 when it was conceived as the carrier for the district heating pipeline. The works were halted in 1997 and the project was adapted to include the carriageways. Construction was resumed in 2010 and the bridge was opened on 1 December 2011.

Location 

The bridge is located just west of Obrenovac, spanning the river from the village of Urovci, right next to the TPP Nikola Tesla power plant (TENT). It connects the Lower Kolubara region with Syrmia, near Progar, in the municipality of Surčin.

The bridge is part of the Sremska gazela ("Syrmian gazelle") road, as of 2017 still under construction, which is to connect Obrenovac with the interchange loop at Dobanovci, on the European route E70. On the Obrenovac side, the  access road to the R101 road (Obrenovac-Ub-Valjevo) has also been built.

History 

The bridge was originally projected as the carrier for the district heating pipeline, hence the closeness to the power plant.), The foundation stone was set on the Obrenovac side in 1994, during the mayoral tenure of Nebojša Čović, and it was supposed to connect the plant with the New Belgrade. In 1997 the project was changed to include the possibility of transporting tanks and other military technics and then the idea was expanded to include the regular traffic. Due to the financial constraints, the works were halted in 1998 and the NATO bombing of Serbia in 1999 pushed this project out of any future plans as so much other infrastructure had to be repaired. In the next years nothing new was done as works included only the maintenance of the already placed steel construction and the reparation of one of the pillars which was damaged by the barge.

The idea resurfaced in 2006 when the discussions were held on the profitability of the heating pipeline and eventually the pipeline idea was dropped. Initiated by mayor Dragan Đilas, tentative works on further building began in April 2010 and the full blown construction ensued in 2011. The bridge was opened, as planned, on 1 December 2011.

Characteristics 

It consists of two different constructions, the steel and the concrete one. The grid was assembled on the bank and then elevated via the floating crane. The bridge is constructed in the style of the typical beam bridge.

The works were done by the Mostogradnja company.

Importance 

The bridge shortened the trip to only 10 minutes.

District heating pipeline 

The completion of the bridge revived the idea of the district heating, which was behind the idea of the bridge in the first place. It was then decided that the project is unprofitable, so the pipes were take out and the canal was covered. Majority of the heating in Belgrade is provided from the imported natural gas, while the additional heating in times of necessity is provided by the mazut which will be banned from the European Union in 2021.

The TENT would fill the pipes between Obrenovac and New Belgrade with decarburized water. In TENT, the water would then be heated in the heat exchangers via the overheated steam produced by the power plant's turbines. Several sub-pumps (Sava, Boljevci, Ostružnica) will pump the heated water into the direction of New Belgrade. The system should contain  of circulating water. That would be enough for the base heating of the half of Belgrade's current needs (a total of 310,000 dwelling units have been connected to the district heating system). In this case, the rest of the heating will be provided by the natural gas.

The project will, for the most part, follow the old plan, but being updated with some new solutions. Old pipes can't be used as they deteriorated, and they served for the draining of the Kolubara mines after the catastrophic 2014 Southeast Europe floods, but the concreted canal can, and will be unearthed. Total length of the pipeline will be . The bridge is projected to be a part of the new pipeline, too. In the best case scenario, the work will start in the spring of 2019 and finished by the winter of 2020–21.

References

External links

Buildings and structures in Belgrade
Bridges in Belgrade
Road bridges in Serbia
Bridges over the Sava in Serbia
Bridges completed in 2011
2011 establishments in Serbia
Surčin
Obrenovac